Jay Kogen is an American comedy writer, producer, actor and director.

Biography
He was born to a Jewish family. His father is comedy writer Arnie Kogen. In 2001, Kogen had a son, Charlie, who is now a musician.

Career
Kogen co-wrote several episodes of The Tracey Ullman Show and The Simpsons along with former writing partner Wallace Wolodarsky. Since then, he has written for several shows, including an Emmy Award winning stint at Frasier, Everybody Loves Raymond, George Lopez, and Malcolm in the Middle. Kogen also made an appearance in The Aristocrats. He was a consulting producer on The Class, co-writer of the Dave Foley/David Anthony Higgins 1997 film The Wrong Guy, as well as being a former stand-up comedian.

In 2009, he started working on the Nickelodeon TV series The Troop. He is also the creator of Wendell & Vinnie.

In 2015, he became a writer & co-executive producer of Dan Schneider & Dana Olsen's live-action sitcom, Henry Danger.

On April 15, 2019, Kogen joined other WGA writers in firing their agents as part of the WGA's stand against the ATA and the practice of packaging.

On December 9, 2020, Kogen and Ali Schouten signed on to develop an iCarly revival series. On February 25, 2021, it was reported that Kogen left the project due to "creative differences" with star Miranda Cosgrove.

Notable filmography 
The Simpsons
"Homer's Odyssey"
"Krusty Gets Busted"
"Treehouse of Horror"
"Bart the Daredevil"
"Old Money"
"Like Father, Like Clown"
"Lisa the Greek"
"Bart's Friend Falls in Love"
"Treehouse of Horror III"
"Last Exit to Springfield"

Frasier
"My Fair Frasier"
"Ain't Nobody's Business If I Do"
"Sweet Dreams"
"Frasier's Curse"
"Merry Christmas, Mrs. Moskowitz"
"IQ"
"Something About Dr. Mary"
"Morning Becomes Entertainment"

 Malcolm in the Middle
"Tiki Lounge"
"College Recruiters"
"Hal's Dentist"

References

External links

Jay Kogen Reddit Questionnaire (September 17, 2012)

Living people
American television writers
American male television writers
Television producers from New York City
Place of birth missing (living people)
Emmy Award winners
University of California, Los Angeles alumni
Writers from Brooklyn
Jewish American male actors
Screenwriters from New York (state)
21st-century American Jews
Year of birth missing (living people)